Steven Charleston (born February 15, 1949) is a retired American Episcopal bishop and academic. He was bishop of the Episcopal Diocese of Alaska from 1991 to 1996, and dean of Episcopal Divinity School, from 1999 to 2008.

Early life and education
Charleston was born and grew up in Oklahoma and is a citizen of the Choctaw Nation of Oklahoma. In 1971 he received a bachelor's degree in Religion from Trinity College in Hartford, Connecticut, followed by a master's degree in Divinity from Episcopal Divinity School in 1976.

Ordained ministry
He later worked in Native American ministries and held various teaching positions.

In 1999, following the divisions exposed by the previous year's Lambeth Conference, he was the author of the Cambridge Accord: an attempt to reach agreement on at least the human rights of homosexual people, notwithstanding controversy within the Anglican Communion about the churches' views of homosexuality.

As of 2017 Charleston was adjunct professor of Native American ministries at Saint Paul School of Theology, based at Oklahoma City University. Via the web at the same time he described himself as a "Native American elder, author, and retired Episcopal bishop", and maintained a public presence through his Facebook page of daily spiritual reflections. He has self-published several volumes of these reflections, plus two novels of a planned trilogy, through his company Red Moon Publications.

Bibliography
 
 
 
 
 
 Self-published annual collections of Charleston's daily reflections:
 
 
 
 
 
Self-published novels:

References

1949 births
Living people
Choctaw Nation of Oklahoma people
Native American Episcopalians
Trinity College (Connecticut) alumni
Episcopal Divinity School alumni
Episcopal bishops of Alaska